Uttaranchal University is  located at Dehradun, Uttarakhand, India near Indian Military Academy. It was established by an Act of the Uttarakhand Legislative Assembly under Shri Shushila Devi education foundation.

History

The University is  promoted by Sushila Devi Centre for Professional Studies and Research, a society registered under Societies Registration Act 1860. First it was known as Law College Dehradun (LCD) but now it is known as The Uttaranchal University.

Campus

Academic profile
The Uttaranchal University has been recognized by the UGC under sections 2(f) and 12(B) of the UGC Act, 1956. The University is made up of several  faculties and departments. The departments are governed by statutes and regulations promulgated by the University Grants Commission, Government of India.

Accreditation
Uttaranchal University has been also accredited with NAAC grade A+.

Constituent colleges
 Uttranchal School of Computing Science (USCS)
 Uttaranchal Institute of Technology (UIT)
 Uttaranchal Institute of Management (UIM)
 Law College Dehradun (LCD)
 School of Applied & Life Sciences (SALS)
 School of Agriculture (SOA)
 Uttaranchal Institute of Pharmaceutical Sciences (UIPS)
 School of Liberal Arts (SLA)
 Uttaranchal School of Hotel & Hospitality Management
 uttaranchal school of Nursing sciences.
 Research and Development Department
 Uttaranchal School of Journalism & Mass Communication

References

External links 
 

Universities in Uttarakhand
Universities and colleges in Dehradun
2013 establishments in Uttarakhand
Educational institutions established in 2013